This is a list of organizations responsible for the governing of the sport of rugby league.

International
 Rugby League International Federation

Africa
 Morocco Rugby League
Lebanese Rugby League Federation
 South Africa Rugby League

Asia-Pacific
Asia-Pacific Rugby League Confederation

Asia
 Japan Rugby League
 Singapore Rugby League
Emirates Rugby League
 Philippines National Rugby League

Australia
Australian Rugby League Commission
Australian Universities Rugby League
New South Wales Rugby League
Country Rugby League
NSW Tertiary Student Rugby League
Queensland Rugby League
Tasmanian Rugby League
Northern Territory Rugby League
South Australian Rugby League
Victorian Rugby League
Western Australian Rugby League

New Zealand
New Zealand Rugby League
Auckland Rugby League
Bay of Plenty Rugby League
Canterbury Rugby League
Manawatu Rugby League
Rugby League Hawkes Bay
Taranaki Rugby League
Waikato Rugby League
Wellington Rugby League
West Coast Rugby League

Pacific Islands
Pacific Islands Rugby League Federation
Papua New Guinea Rugby Football League
Solomon Islands Rugby League Federation
Fiji National Rugby League
Tonga National Rugby League

Atlantic
Canada Rugby League
 USA Rugby League

 West Indies Rugby League Federation
Jamaica Rugby League Association

Europe
Rugby League European Federation

Britain and Ireland
Rugby Football League
British Amateur Rugby League Association
Student Rugby League
Rugby League Ireland
Irish Amateur Rugby League Association
Scotland Rugby League
Wales Rugby League

Continental Europe
 Belgium Rugby League
 Associació Catalana de Rugby Lliga
 Czech Rugby League Association
 Estonia Rugby League Federation (defunct)
 Fédération Française de Rugby à XIII
 Georgia Rugby League
 Rugby League Deutschland
 Greek Rugby League
 Federazione Italiana Rugby League
 Maltese Rugby League Association
 Netherlands Rugby League Bond
 Portuguese Rugby League Association
 Russian Rugby League Federation
 Serbian Rugby League

South America
 Rugby League Argentina

See also

References

External links

 
Rugby league
Rugby league organisations